John Wilkinson Taylor (26 September 1906 Covington, Kentucky – 11 December 2001 Denver, Colorado) was a U.S. educator.  He was President of the University of Louisville from 1947 to 1950.  He served as the acting director general of UNESCO between 1952 and 1953, following the resignation of Jaime Torres Bodet. He died on 11 December 2001 at the age of 95.

References

UNESCO Director-General's List

1906 births
2001 deaths
UNESCO Directors-General
Presidents of the University of Louisville
American officials of the United Nations
People from Covington, Kentucky
20th-century American academics